The Loners (original Hebrew title: HaBodedim) is a 2009 Israeli drama film directed by Renen Schorr starring Sasha Avshalom Agrounov and Anton Ostrovsky.

The film describes the takeover of a cell block in Prison Six by two inmates, both new immigrants from Russia, soldiers from the Golani Brigade, who were sent to prison for selling weapons to Hamas, and who were demanding a retrial.

Background
The original screenplay was inspired by true events. In 1997, there was a Rebellion in Prison Six, during which a number of inmates took over the dining room and captured several jail instructors and sergeants.

Plot
Bluchin, a fighter of the Israel Defense Forces (IDF) Golani Brigade, receives a notice that he is accepted for officers' training. He goes out to celebrate with his friend Glory. The two soldiers are new immigrants of Russian origin, with no relatives in Israel. Some time later, two men are arrested, charged and convicted of selling weapons to Hamas, which were used to carry out an attack in Hadera, which killed five civilians.

The two fighters, who are perceived as traitors, do not want to lose their honor as fighters in the IDF, and request a retrial. But the military system is not interested and decides to release them from the army and transfer them to a civil prison to continue serving their sentences. This causes them to take over a cell block, take as hostages three of the prison's personnel and request a retrial.

During these events, they confide in one of the prison staff, a woman soldier named Ilanit, that Bluchin did not sell any weapons, but had forgotten his personal weapon at a whore that he visited when they celebrated. To help him, Glory stole a weapon from the unit's arsenal and handed it to Bluchin, so the fact that he has lost his own weapon woulds not be known.

Cast
   as Glory
 Anton Ostrovsky as Bluchin
   as Ilanit
 Tzahi Grad as General Ben Aroya
 Henry David as Sergeant Galperin

Awards
 Actor Sasha Agrounov received an Ophir Award for best actor in a lead role.
 The movie received 10 more nominations for the Ophir Award, in art direction, cinematography, direction, editing, music, screenplay, sound, best supporting actor, best supporting actress and best film.
 The movie was nominated for best film at the Jerusalem Film Festival.

See also
 Late Summer Blues - Schorr's previous feature film.

External links
 

2009 films
2009 drama films
Films about the Israel Defense Forces
Israeli drama films
2000s prison drama films